FC Irtysh Pavlodar (Ertis Fýtbol Klýby) was a Kazakh professional football club based at the Central Stadium in Pavlodar. Irtysh won the Kazakhstan Premier league in 1993 (as Ansat), 1997, 1999, 2002 and 2003. The club was also founding members of the top league and never relegated to lower levels before being dissolved. Irtysh had participated in the AFC Champions League a number of times, reaching the semi-finals in 2001 (the final year of Kazakhstan's AFC affiliation), and played in UEFA Champions League qualifying round in 2003.

History
On 9 August 2017, Dimitar Dimitrov resigned as manager of the club, with Sergei Klimov being appointed in a caretaker capacity the next day. Vyacheslav Hroznyi was appointed as the club's permanent manager on 17 August 2017, leaving the club at the end of the 2017 season. On 21 December 2017, Gerard Nus was appointed as the new manager of Irtysh Pavlodar on a two-year contract.

On 28 April 2018 Nus was sacked as the club's manager, with Dmitry Kuznetsov being appointed as Caretaker Manager. On 10 July 2018, Irtysh Pavlodar announced the return of Dimitar Dimitrov on a two-and-a-half-year contract.

At the end of April 2019, rumors that manager Dimitar Dimitrov had left his role were downplayed by the club, but Dimitrov and his coaching staff subsequently went AWOL for Irtysh Pavlodar's match against Zhetysu on 1 May 2019. The following day, 2 May 2019, Dimitrov and his staff where summoned by club's leadership to explain their absence. Their explanation wasn't deemed valid by the club and Dimitrov was suspended. Sergey Klimov was appointed as caretaker manager. On 7 June 2019, Milan Milanović was announced as the club's new manager.

On 30 May, the Professional Football League of Kazakhstan announced that Irtysh Pavlodar had withdrawn from the league due to financial problems. All of their matches were excluded from the league results.

Naming history
1965 : Founded as Irtysh
1968 : Renamed Traktor
1993 : Renamed  Ansat
1996 : Renamed  Irtysh
1999 : Renamed  Irtysh-Bastau for sponsorship reasons
2000 : Renamed  Irtysh again

Statistics

Domestic history
{| class="wikitable mw-collapsible mw-collapsed"  style="font-size:90%; text-align:center;"
|- style="background:#efefef;"
! rowspan="2" | Season
! colspan="9" | League
! rowspan="2" | Kazakhstan Cup
! colspan="2" | Top goalscorer
! rowspan="2" | Managers
|-
! Div.
! Pos.
! Pl.
! W
! D
! L
! GS
! GA
! P
! Name
! League
|-
||1992||align=center|1st|| style="background:#deb678;"|3||26||14||8||4||39||22||36||-|| Rylov||align=center|16|| Yaryshev
|-
||1993||align=center|1st|| style="background:gold;"|1||22||14||6||2||43||15||34||-|| Antonov||align=center|20|| Yaryshev /  Veretnov
|-
||1994||align=center|1st|| style="background:silver;"|2||30||17||7||6||57||14||41||-|| Abildaev||align=center|14|| Veretnov
|-
||1995||align=center|1st||7||30||12||9||9||38||28||45||-|| Antonov /  D.Malikov /  Rylov||align=center|8|| Chebotarev
|-
||1996||align=center|1st|| style="background:silver;"|2||34||23||5||6||60||22||74||-|| Antonov||align=center|21|| Veretnov
|-
||1997||align=center|1st|| style="background:gold;"|1||26||17||5||4||46||15||56||-|| Zubarev||align=center|10|| Veretnov
|-
||1998||align=center|1st|| style="background:#deb678;"|3||26||17||6||3||44||15||57||style="background:gold;"|Winners|| Antonov||align=center|10|| Talgayev /  Berdalin
|-
||1999||align=center|1st|| style="background:gold;"|1||30||24||4||2||69||19||76||-|| Zubarev||align=center|22|| Chernov /  Linchevskiy
|-
||2000||align=center|1st|| style="background:#deb678;"|3||28||19||3||6||50||26||60||-|| Mendes||align=center|21|| Linchevskiy
|-
||2001||align=center|1st||4||32||17||9||6||48||22||60||style="background:silver;"|Runners-up|| Mendes||align=center|9|| Nazarenko
|-
||2002||align=center|1st|| style="background:gold;"|1||32||21||8||3||63||14||71||style="background:silver;"|Runners-up|| Shatskikh||align=center|13|| Ogai
|-
||2003||align=center|1st|| style="background:gold;"|1||32||25||3||4||59||20||78||-|| Agaýew||align=center|11|| Ogai
|-
||2004||align=center|1st|| style="background:silver;"|2||36||24||7||5||56||16||79||-|| Tleshev||align=center|12|| Ogai
|-
||2005||align=center|1st||5||30||18||3||9||51||24||57||-|| Tleshev||align=center|20|| Volgin
|-
||2006||align=center|1st||6||30||13||8||9||34||24||47||-|| Urazow||align=center|10|| Volgin
|-
||2007||align=center|1st||4||30||16||4||10||34||27||52||-|| Strukov||align=center|8|| Volgin
|-
||2008||align=center|1st|| style="background:#deb678;"|3||30||18||8||4||58||28||62||Quarter-finals|| Tleshev||align=center|13|| Saduov
|-
||2009||align=center|1st||9||26||8||5||13||24||31||29||Quarter-finals|| Daskalov||align=center|5|| Saduov /  Nazarenko
|-
||2010||align=center|1st||style="background:#deb678;"|3||32||16||8||8||39||30||56||Third round|| Daskalov||align=center|15|| Baisufinov
|-
||2011||align=center|1st||5||32||15||5||12||50||50||32||Semi-finals|| Maltsev||align=center|10|| Baisufinov
|-
||2012||align=center|1st||style="background:silver;"|2||26||15||6||5||46||20||51||style="background:silver;"|Runners-up|| Bakayev||align=center|14|| Baisufinov
|-
||2013||align=center|1st||4||32||12||8||12||41||39||27||Semi-finals|| Begalyn||align=center|5|| Baisufinov
|-
||2014||align=center|1st||10||32||9||7||16||39||44||25||Quarter-finals|| Dudchenko||align=center|11|| Baisufinov /  Rüütli /  Saduova /  Cheryshev
|-
||2015||align=center|1st||6||32||10||10||12||37||39||25||Second round|| Dudchenko||align=center|8|| Cheryshev /  Klimov(caretaker) /  Dimitrov
|-
||2016||align=center|1st||style="background:#deb678;"|3||32||14||7||11||52||36||49||Semi-finals|| Murtazayev||align=center|18|| Dimitrov
|-
||2017||align=center|1st||4||33||12||12||9||35||32||48||Quarter-final|| António /  Darabayev /  Fonseca||align=center|5|| Dimitrov /  Klimov (caretaker) /  Hroznyi
|-
||2018||align=center|1st||10||33||10||5||18||28||45||35||Semi-final|| Shabalin||align=center|5|| Nus /  Kuznetsov (caretaker) /  Saduov /  Dimitrov 
|-
||2019||align=center|1st||8||33||11||4||18||30||45||37||Quarter-final|| Manzorro||align=center|6|| Dimitrov /  Klimov (caretaker) /  Milanović 
|-
||2020||align=center|1st||12||colspan="7"|||n/a|| Fonseca||align=center|1|| Babayan 
|}

Continental history

1 Irtysh were ejected from the competition for using two ineligible players.

 IFA Shield
1993: Runners-up

UEFA coefficient 

The table shows the position of FC Irtysh Pavlodar (highlighted), based on their UEFA coefficient club ranking.

As of 1 June 2018.

Honours

Domestic
Kazakhstan Premier League (5): 1993, 1997, 1999, 2002, 2003
Kazakhstan Cup (1): 1998
Kazakh SSR Cup (1): 1988

International
IFA Shield (IFA) : Runners-up (1993)

Last squad
.

Managers
Information correct as of match played 10 November 2019. Only competitive matches are counted.

Notes:

Notes

References

External links
Official website

See also

 Kazakhstani football clubs in European competitions

 
Football clubs in Kazakhstan
Association football clubs established in 1965
1965 establishments in the Kazakh Soviet Socialist Republic